Głogowa may refer to the following places:
Głogowa, Koło County in Greater Poland Voivodeship (west-central Poland)
Głogowa, Ostrów Wielkopolski County in Greater Poland Voivodeship (west-central Poland)
Głogowa, Łódź Voivodeship (central Poland)
Głogowa, Turek County in Greater Poland Voivodeship (west-central Poland)